Scarfies (released as Crime 101 in the United States) is a 1999 New Zealand black comedy film set in the southern university city of Dunedin. The film's original title comes from the local nickname for university students, scarfie, so called because of the traditional blue and gold scarves worn by students during the city's cool winters in support of the Otago Rugby Football Union.

Plot
Scarfies starts off as a light comedy centred on a group of five students who get together after moving into a flat that is seemingly abandoned, but still has the power on, making it a free but filthy accommodation.

The film twists into something darker part way through, with elements of both black comedy and thriller. The discovery of a large crop of marijuana being grown in the basement leads firstly to euphoria, then paranoia and arguments amongst the flatmates about what will happen when the real owners come back to collect it. When Kevin, the crop's owner appears, the students fear for their lives and lock him in the basement. Events unfold against a backdrop of the city's biggest sporting event for years, the final of New Zealand's national rugby championship.

Cast
Willa O'Neill as Emma
Neill Rea as Scott
Ashleigh Seagar as Nicola
Taika Cohen as Alex
Charlie Bleakley as Graham
Jon Brazier as Kevin
Mark Neilson as Gordy

Production
Despite the deliberate use of shots focusing on the city's dowdier and darker elements, much of the film's photography and soundtrack is an homage to the city, including the use of several Dunedin sound songs in the soundtrack (top local band The Clean even make a cameo appearance during the film).

The film initially had a small production budget of $250,000, but later received an additional $1.6 million in funding from the New Zealand Film Commission.

Reception
Scarfies was well-received, described as "...the most outlandishly entertaining New Zealand film for years...", and did well at the box-office.

Soundtrack
Save My Life – Bike
Outer Space – 3Ds
George – Headless Chickens
Doledrums – The Chills
Let There Be Love – JPS Experience
Tally Ho – The Clean
Suck – Love's Ugly Children
Cactus Cat – Look Blue Go Purple
Gaze – Bike
Randolph's Going Home – Shayne Carter and Peter Jefferies
Death and the Maiden – The Verlaines
She Speeds – Straitjacket Fits
Grey Parade – JPS Experience

References

External links 
 

1999 films
New Zealand black comedy films
Films set in New Zealand
Films shot in New Zealand
Dunedin in fiction
1999 comedy films
1990s black comedy films
Stoner films
Films about cannabis
University of Otago
1990s English-language films